The ETAP 35i is a Belgian sailboat that was designed as a cruiser and first built in 1992.

Production
The design was built by ETAP Yachting in Belgium starting in 1992, but it is now out of production.

Design
The ETAP 35i is a recreational keelboat, built predominantly of glassfibre, with wood trim. It is made from a polyester glassfibre foam sandwich that makes the boat unsinkable. It has a fractional sloop masthead sloop rig, a raked stem, a reverse transom with boarding steps, an internally mounted spade-type rudder controlled by a wheel and a fixed fin keel. It displaces  and carries  of ballast.

The design has sleeping accommodation for six people, with a double "V"-berth in the bow cabin, two straight settees in the main cabin and a small aft cabin with a double berth on the port side. The galley is located on the port side just forward of the companionway ladder. The galley is "L"-shaped and is equipped with a three-burner stove and a double sink. A navigation station is opposite the galley, on the starboard side. The head is located just aft of navigation station on the starboard side and includes a shower. The bow cabin also has a sink.

For sailing downwind the design may be equipped with a spinnaker.

Operational history
The boat was at one time supported by a class club, the ETAP Owners Association.

In a 2010 review in Yachting Monthly Dick Durham wrote, "An excellent cruising boat – fast, seaworthy, thoughtfully designed and very reasonably priced considering the high quality of build. Etaps also tend to hold their value well on the second-hand market. The unsinkability factor and double-skin construction is a reassuring bonus, offering soundproofing, thermal insulation and eradicating condensation. One fly in the ointment is the optimistic addition of the aft ‘cabin’. I believe that very few yachts under 40 ft LOA should have one, and on this boat it's no more than a giant locker."

See also
List of sailing boat types

References

External links
Video: sailing an ETAP 35i
Photo of an ETAP 35i
Photo of an ETAP 35i

Keelboats
1980s sailboat type designs
Sailing yachts
Sailboat types built by ETAP Yachting